The Tukhchar massacre was an incident during the War of Dagestan, filmed and distributed on tape, in which Russian prisoners of war were executed. Throughout the war, Russian soldiers reported finding taped executions of Russian officers and men.  Some videos were later sold as snuff films and ended up online. One tape created in September 1999 showed six Russian servicemen, one as young as 19, being brutally executed by Chechen militants. The method was a pierced trachea.

Battle
On 5 September 1999, two units of Chechen militants crossed into Dagestan, seizing the border village of Tukhchar, Novolaksky District. The Chechen commander leading the attack was identified as Umar Edilsultanov (known as Karpinsky Amir, named after the microdistrict of Karpinka in Grozny), a subordinate of Abdul-Malik Mezhidov, commander of the Islamic religious police of Ichkeria.

Attacking very early in the morning, the Chechens found and exchanged fire with 12 Russian conscripts and one officer of the Kalachevsky brigade stationed at a police checkpoint to strengthen border security. Shortly after the fighting began, the Russian operator of the unit's 30 mm BMP-2 was killed, communication was disrupted, and the Russians had run out of ammunition. Senior lieutenant Vasily Tashkin ordered a retreat to a second checkpoint. During a lull in the battle, local residents told Russian soldiers that the Chechens had given them half an hour to leave the village. The villagers brought with them civilian clothing so they could smuggle the policemen and soldiers out of town safely. Tashkin refused to retreat any further, and his resolve convinced others to stay as well. When the half hour was up, the Chechen militants began to search for the Russian defenders, who had been hidden by the townspeople. Six of them barricaded themselves in a barn, but the Chechens surrounded it and poured gasoline on the walls, threatening to burn the structure down. The Chechen militants called for the Russians to surrender, claiming that their intent was to obtain leverage for a prisoner exchange.

Massacre
The prisoners were ordered to lie face down on a track outside the village, and Edilsultanov selected five men from his unit to cut the prisoners' throats. The sixth (Alexey Polagaev) was killed by Edilsultanov himself. One of the Russian soldiers, identified as Alexey Lipatov, fled the site, but was shot. The others killed were named as Senior lieutenant Vasily Tashkin, Vladimir Kaufman, Boris Erdneyev, Alexey Polagaev, and Alexey Paranin.

Aftermath 
The morning following the executions, village head Magomed-Sultan Khasanov sought and received permission from the Chechen militants to retrieve the bodies of the Russian soldiers. The Chechens held the village until 8 September. Survivors Alexey Ivanov and Fyodor Tchernavin escaped execution by remaining in hiding. Ivanov spent two days in an attic, while Tchernavin hid for five days in a basement, and it was not until after they were rescued that they learned of their colleagues' deaths. In late September, the soldiers were quietly buried, with their families unaware of the gruesome nature of their deaths.

Investigation 
In 2000, the film showing the killings was discovered by Russia's security service on sale in Grozny, which sparked an investigation into this as a war crime.

Tamerlan Khasaev 
The first perpetrator of the massacre identified was Tamerlan Khasaev. At the time Khasaev was already in jail for kidnapping a man in December 2001, and by chance a police officer happened to see the tape and recognized Khasaev from the earlier abduction investigation. Khasaev was brought back to Dagestan from a jail in central Russia to face charges for the death of Alexey Lipatov. In an interview with a Russian investigator, Khasaev said he was simply following orders, and while he described the act as "unpleasant", he expressed no remorse.

Khasaev faced a trial before the Dagestan Supreme Court in October 2002. He pleaded guilty only in part, admitting to participation in illegal militant groups, armed rebellion, and illegal possession of firearms. In his defense, he claimed that he did not strike the killing blow since the sight of blood made him feel ill at ease, and he handed the knife to another fighter. The Russian Lipatov then broke and ran, and a militant shot him in the back. Previously facing 8.5 years of imprisonment for the kidnapping charge, Khasaev was sentenced to life in prison. The court declared that he deserved the death penalty, but because of a moratorium on its use, life imprisonment would have to suffice. Khasaev died in prison shortly afterward.

Islan Mukaev 
Police later detained Islan Mukaev (murderer of Vladimir Kaufman), known as a former Chechen militant, for the crimes. Mukaev lived in the Ingush district centre of Ordzhonikidzevskaya. In 2005, he was sentenced to 25 years in prison.

Arbi Dandaev 
Authorities in 2000 identified Arbi Dandaev, accused of executing lieutenant Vasily Tashkin and Boris Erdneyev. Dandaev evaded capture for eight years but was arrested in Grozny by Chechen police on 3 April 2008. According to the investigation, Dandaev turned himself in, confessed to the crime, and confirmed his testimony when he was taken to the site of the execution. He pleaded not guilty, however, before the Dagestan Supreme Court, saying that he was interrogated under duress and refused to testify. Nevertheless, the court found his previous admission of guilt valid because it was made in the presence of a lawyer and no complaints were filed at the time. The court studied the film of the execution, and noted that the name Arbi was clearly pronounced in the recording. In interviews with the residents of Tukhchar village, one claimed to recognize Dandaev, although the court weighed the eyewitness evidence lightly given the villager's advanced age and uncertainty.

Dandaev's defense also claimed that Dandaev was mentally disturbed, and petitioned the court multiple times to repeat psychiatric evaluations that previously had determined that the defendant was fit to stand trial. The petition claimed that in 1995, Russian soldiers wounded Dandaev's younger brother in Grozny, and after some time in the military hospital the boy's corpse was returned to the family, his internal organs harvested to fuel the illegal Chechen human organ trafficking trade. According to Dandaev's lawyers, the incident caused intense mental trauma, and the charges against Dandaev were devised to prevent the defendant's father from seeking legal redress for the death of his youngest son. Nonetheless, the court held that Dandaev was sane and that the investigation into his brother's death had no bearing on the case. Dandaev was convicted, and although the prosecutor asked for a sentence of 22 years, the court sentenced Dandaev to life imprisonment in 2009.

Mansur Razhaev 
In 2010, the investigation led to Mansur Razhaev, a 34-year old from Grozny in jail for gang-related crime and robbery. Like Khasaev, he said he was present, but did not strike a killing blow and thus wasn't guilty of murder. During the trial Dandaev testified on behalf of Razhaev. Razhaev was convicted on 31 January 2012 for the execution of Boris Erdneyev and sentenced to life imprisonment.

Rizvan Vagapov 
On 8 August 2011, Rizvan Vagapov was detained by law enforcement agencies in Grozny. He was convicted and sentenced to 18 years imprisonment for his role in the massacre.

See also
 Second Chechen War crimes and terrorism

References 

1999 crimes in Russia
Battles involving Chechnya
Battles involving Russia
Chechen–Russian conflict
Deaths by blade weapons
Filmed executions
History of Dagestan
Massacres in 1999
Massacres in Russia
Prisoner of war massacres
September 1999 events in Russia
War crimes in Russia